Adenostoma is a genus of shrubs in the Rose family (Rosaceae) containing only two species, chamise (Adenostoma fasciculatum) and redshanks (Adenostoma sparsifolium). Both are native to the Californias.

Description

Characteristics 
The plants grow in a habit of shrubs to small trees, and the stem is more or less resinous. Both species in this genus feature stiff, linear leaves arranged alternately or in clusters along stems with shredding bark. Flowers form on a panicle, are cream to white and, as in all members of the rose family, have hypanthia. The fruit is an achene. Chromosome number is 2n = 18.

Distribution and habitat 
Both species are native to coastal California and Baja California. Adenostoma fasciculatum is also native to California in the Sierra Nevada.  They are found in plant communities and sub-ecoregions of the California chaparral and woodlands ecoregion.

Taxonomy 
Phylogenetic analysis places Adenostoma closest to Chamaebatiaria and Sorbaria, and suggests tentative placement in the subfamily Spiraeoideae, tribe Sorbarieae. The name Adenostoma comes from Greek, meaning "glandular mouth," referring to the hypanthium ring gland.

References

External links

 
Sorbarieae
Rosaceae genera
Flora of California
Flora of Baja California
Natural history of the California chaparral and woodlands
Flora without expected TNC conservation status